2-Methyldodecane, an organic compound with a chemical formula C13H28, is an isomer of tridecane. It is produced by the reaction of 1-bromodecane and diisopropyl zinc. Reaction of decylmagnesium bromide and 2-bromopropane produce 2-methyldodecane too. Another method to produce 2-methyldodecane is react 1-dodecene and trimethylaluminium.

References

Alkanes